Charles Hose FRGS. FLS (12 October 1863 – 14 November 1929) was a British colonial administrator, zoologist and ethnologist.

Life and career
He was born in Hertfordshire, England, and was educated at Felsted in Essex. Admitted to Clare College, Cambridge in 1882, he almost immediately migrated to Jesus College, and later left Cambridge without taking a degree. He was offered an administrative cadetship in Sarawak by the second Rajah, Sir Charles Brooke, which he took up in 1884. His large collection of ethnographic objects from Borneo was purchased by the British Museum in 1905.

Animal species named after Hose
Several species named to commemorate his work as zoologist:

Amphibians
Hose's frog, Odorrana hosii found in Thailand, Malaysia and Indonesia
Hose's tree frog, Philautus hosii endemic to Borneo: Indonesia and Malaysia prob. Brunei.
Hose's toad, Pedostibes hosii, toad in Southeast Asia: Brunei, Indonesia, Malaysia, and Thailand

Birds
Hose's broadbill, Calyptomena hosii endemic to Borneo.
Black oriole, Oriolus hosii endemic to Borneo.

Fish
Leptobarbus hosii (Regan 1906) from northern Borneo.
 
Mammals
Hose's shrew or Bornean pygmy shrew, Suncus hosei endemic to Malaysia.
Hose's pygmy flying squirrel, Petaurillus hosei endemic to Malaysia.
Four-striped ground squirrel, Lariscus hosei endemic to Borneo.
Hose's palm civet, Diplogale hosei endemic to Borneo: East Malaysia and Brunei.
Fraser's dolphin, Lagenodelphis hosei
Hose's leaf monkey, Presbytis hosei endemic to Borneo.

Places named after Hose
Place
Hose Mountains on Borneo.
Fort Hose on Borneo Located in Marudi in Sarawak

Bibliography
Books authored by Charles Hose include:
 A descriptive account of the mammals of Borneo (1893)
 The Pagan Tribes of Borneo (a Description of Their Physical Moral and Intellectual Condition with Some Discussion of Their Ethnic Relations) (with William McDougall) (1912) 
 Natural Man: A Record from Borneo (1926)
 Fifty Years of Romance and Research - Or a Jungle-Wallah at Large (1927)
 The Field Book of a Jungle-Wallah: Being a Description of Shore, River and Forest Life in Sarawak (1929)

See also
:Category:Taxa named by Charles Hose

References

Biography

External links 

 
 
 
 Weaving shuttle collected by Charles Hose, BBC History of the World in 100 Objects website

1863 births
1929 deaths
People educated at Felsted School
British administrators in Sarawak
British zoologists
Fellows of the Royal Geographical Society